Notch Peak is a distinctive summit located on Sawtooth Mountain in the House Range, west of Delta, Utah, United States. The peak and the surrounding area are part of the Notch Peak Wilderness Study Area (WSA). Bristlecone pines, estimated to be 3,000 to 4,000 years old, are located on the ridges surrounding Notch Peak.

The Cliff
Notch Peak is one of the highest peaks in the House Range, reaching  .

It is the second highest pure vertical drop in the United States after El Capitan. as well as the highest carbonate rock cliff in North America.

Recreation
One of the more popular uses of the area is the hike to Notch Peak so you can look down the notch in person. The summit can be reached by following a trail from the east side of the mountain in Sawtooth Canyon. The hike is about 7.5 miles round trip (12 km), with  elevation gain.

Climbing

The north face of Notch Peak is divided by a large shelf into an upper and lower wall. There are several rock climbing routes on the limestone cliffs. "The Swiss Route" (never repeated), "Direct North West Ridge (AKA. Pillars of Faith), and "Book of Saturdays" ascend the upper wall. On the lower wall "Appetite for Destruction" and "Western Hardman" reach  of vertical. Climbing on all of these routes is adventurous with rockfall hazard and loose flakes of widely varying size. In addition to the face of Notch Peak, the granite found in the canyon below the notch is also used for climbing.

Geology

This part of the House Range is chiefly made up of a passive margin sequence of Cambrian to Ordovician carbonate rocks. The top of the range is the type section for the aptly named Notch Peak Dolomite. At the base of the range is the pink/orange Notch Peak granite and monzonite, which is Jurassic in age (143 to 169 million years old).  Around Notch Peak, especially from the west side (Tule Valley side), white Lake Bonneville fossiliferous marls occur.

Because of the intrusion, a hike up the canyon below the notch can clearly show a well-developed metamorphic aureole and even inter-fingering textures between the intrusion and the bedrock. Also, small quantities of tungsten and placer gold have been found around the Notch Peak area.

Gallery

References

External links

 

Mountains of Utah
Mountains of Millard County, Utah
Cliffs of the United States